Joe Paquette (May 5, 1963 – May 16, 2001), better known by his stage name Prince Ital Joe, was a Dominican singer of reggae and ragga best known for his collaborations with Marky Mark and Death Row Records artists. Prince Ital Joe also did some acting, appearing in the Steven Seagal film, Marked for Death and in the TV series, EZ Streets and Players.

Life and career
Prince Ital Joe was born in the Commonwealth of Dominica, and moved to Brooklyn, New York at the age of 13 with his parents in 1976. After completing high school, Joe moved to California to pursue his dreams of acting and entertainment.  Before getting into the music business, Joe worked for over ten years performing at private Hollywood parties and clubs and From 1988 to 1990 as a concert promoter in the Caribbean for acts like Ziggy Marley.

In 1993, he teamed up with rapper Marky Mark and released two albums 1994's Life in the Streets and 1995's The Remix Album.

After The Remix album, the duo split up with Joe signing on Suge Knight and Dr. Dre's Death Row Records label, appearing on Tha Dogg Pound's Dogg Food, Makaveli's The Don Killuminati: The 7 Day Theory and Daz Dillinger's Retaliation, Revenge & Get Back, and while an album was in the works, it was never released. He remained in the music business until his death.

Personal life
He married Paulina Paquette and had a daughter, Princess Nashida Paquette.

Prince Ital Joe died on May 16, 2001 from injuries sustained in a car accident that happened on a highway near Phoenix, Arizona while en route to Los Angeles. He was 38 years old.

Discography

Studio albums
Prince Ital Joe and Marky Mark

Remix albums
Prince Ital Joe and Marky Mark

Singles
Prince Ital Joe and Marky Mark

Other related releases

 1999 : Prince Ital Joe feat. W.C. - Stereo Type (Unreleased Death Row Records Track)
 1999 : Prince Ital Joe feat. Kurupt & Coolio - 2Pac Tribute (Unreleased Death Row Records Track)
 1999 : Prince Ital Joe feat. Daz Dillinger - Watcha Gonna Do (Unreleased Death Row Records Track)

References

1963 births
2001 deaths
American reggae musicians
Death Row Records artists
Dominica emigrants to the United States
Eurodance musicians
Interscope Records artists
Road incident deaths in Arizona
20th-century American musicians